Lorne Knauft (born July 7, 1968) is a Canadian retired professional ice hockey defenceman.

Knauft was the head coach for the Lapeer Loggers of the All American Hockey League during the 2010-11 season.

Career statistics

References

External links

1968 births
Living people
Adirondack Red Wings players
Alaska Anchorage Seawolves men's ice hockey players
Anchorage Aces players
Brantford Smoke players
Penticton Knights players
Canadian ice hockey defencemen
Detroit Vipers players
Flint Generals players
Houston Aeros (1994–2013) players
Ice hockey people from Alberta
Muskegon Fury players
People from Hanna, Alberta
Portland Pirates players
Rochester Americans players
Thunder Bay Thunder Hawks players